The Union Street Bridge is a double leaf Scherzer rolling lift bascule carrying Union Street over the Gowanus Canal in the New York City borough of Brooklyn. The bridge cost $85,206.85 and opened on March 4, 1905.

References

1905 establishments in New York City
Bridges completed in 1905
Bridges in Brooklyn